Kolob is a rural locality (a selo) in Ishtiburinsky Selsoviet, Untsukulsky District, Republic of Dagestan, Russia. The population was 241 as of 2010.

Geography 
Kolob is located 37 km west of Shamilkala (the district's administrative centre) by road. Ishtiburi is the nearest rural locality.

References 

Rural localities in Untsukulsky District